Elachista zabella is a moth in the family Elachistidae. It was described by Pierre Chrétien in 1908. It is found in Algeria.

References

Moths described in 1908
zabella
Moths of Africa